The Galician derby is the name given to any association football match contested between Celta Vigo and Deportivo La Coruña, the two biggest clubs in Galicia.

Head-to-head statistics
As of 5 May 2018

League matches

Cup matches

Head-to-head ranking in La Liga (1929–2022)

• Total: Celta with 18 higher finishes, Deportivo with 17 higher finishes (when both teams competed in La Liga in the same season).

References
 

Football rivalries in Spain
RC Celta de Vigo
Deportivo de La Coruña
Sport in Galicia (Spain)
Recurring sporting events established in 1928